This is a list of exophonic writers, i.e. those who write in a language not generally regarded as their first or mother tongue. For more on the phenomenon, see the main article Exophony.

The list below is deliberately brief, eschewing complex details of ethnicity/nationality and the like: the countries and/or languages given are merely a guide to the writer's principal origin and exophonic language - for details see the relevant article on the writer.

 Kader Abdolah, Persian–Dutch writer, poet and columnist who writes in Dutch.
 Chingiz Abdullayev, Azerbaijani-Russian writer
 Chinua Achebe, Nigerian native, who lived most of his later life in the United States. Native speaker of Igbo who wrote primarily in English.
 Chinghiz Aitmatov, Kyrgyz-Russian novelist
 Sholem Aleichem, native of the Russian Empire who later emigrated to Switzerland. His native language was Yiddish but he also wrote in Hebrew and Russian.
 Vassilis Alexakis, Greek-French novelist
 Jeffrey Angles, American translator also known for his poetry and writing in Japanese. 
 Michael Arlen, Bulgarian born Armenian-British author
 Nadeem Aslam, Pakistani-British novelist
 Augustine of Hippo, Numidian Berber philosopher writing in Latin
 Ba Jin, Chinese and Esperanto author. He wrote three original works in Esperanto.* Samuel Beckett, Irish-French playwright and novelist
 José María Blanco White, Spanish-English writer
 Karen Blixen (Isak Dinesen), Danish writer who wrote in both Danish and English
 Irena Brežná, Slovak-Swiss writer and journalist
 André Brink, (South African) English-Afrikaans novelist
 Joseph Brodsky, Russian-American poet and essayist
 Elias Canetti, Bulgarian born Sephardic writer, British citizen, writing in German
 Paul Celan, Romanian born poet writing in Romanian and German 
 Chahan Chahnour, French-Armenian writer and poet
 Eugen Chirovici, Romanian-British novelist
 Don Mee Choi, Korean-American poet and translator
 Heciyê Cindî, Kurdish-Armenian writer and linguist
 Emil Cioran, Romanian-French writer
 Joseph Conrad, Polish-British novelist
 David Dephy, Georgian-American poet novelist essayist multi-media artist
 Ariel Dorfman, Chilean-American writer
 Raymond Federman, French-American novelist
 Boris Fishman, Russian-American novelist
 Kahlil Gibran, Lebanese-American poet
 Julien Green, American writer who wrote in French
 Xiaolu Guo, Chinese-British novelist
 Najat El Hachmi, Moroccan-Catalan novelist and journalist
 Aleksandar Hemon, Bosnian-American novelist and journalist
 Stefan Heym, German-American novelist
 Rolando Hinojosa, American-Mexican novelist
 Anselm Hollo, Finnish-American poet
 Khalid Hosseini, Afghan-American novelist
 Nancy Huston, Canadian novelist
 Kazuo Ishiguro, Japanese-British novelist
 Fleur Jaeggy, Swiss-Italian writer
 Tahar Ben Jelloun, Moroccan-French novelist
 Ha Jin, Chinese-American poet and novelist
 Diego Jourdan Pereira, Uruguayan writer
 Hans Keller, Austrian-British musicologist and essayist in English
 Jack Kerouac, American novelist and poet
 Yasmina Khadra, Algerian-French novelist
 Imam Ahmad Raza Khan, Indian Urdu-Arabic-Persian-Hindi Sufi poet and writer.
 Arthur Koestler, Hungarian-British author and journalist
 Agota Kristof, Hungarian-French novelist
 Milan Kundera, Czech-French writer
 Jhumpa Lahiri, British-American writer, writing in Italian
 Tahar Lamri, Algerian-Italian journalist and short story writer
 Aga Lesiewicz, Polish-British novelist,
 Hideo Levy, American-born Japanese language author
 Yiyun Li, Chinese-American novelist and short story writer
 Jonathan Littell, American-French novelist
 Ramon Llull, Majorcan, Catalan-Latin-Arabic writer
 Lucian, second-century AD Syrian satirist, a native speaker of Syriac who wrote in Attic Greek
 Amin Maalouf, Lebanese-French novelist
 Merab Mamardashvili, Georgian philosopher who wrote exclusively in Russian
 Vladimir Nabokov, Russian-American novelist
 C.W. Nicol, Welsh-Japanese writer
 Téa Obreht, Bosniak-American novelist
 Fernando Pessoa, Portuguese-English/French poet
 Edith Philips, American-French language writer and educator
 Atiq Rahimi, Afghan/Persian-French and English novelist and filmmaker
 Ayn Rand, Russian-American novelist
 Rafael Sabatini, Italian-British popular novelist in English
 Edward Said, Palestinian-American literary critic and philosopher
 Kurban Said, pseudonymous Azerbaijani novelist in German
 Elif Şafak, Turkish-English novelist and journalist
 George Santayana (Jorge de Santayana y Borrás), Spanish-American philosopher and novelist in English
 Mohammad-Hossein Shahriar, Turkish-Persian poet
 Gary Shteyngart, Russian-American novelist
 Shumona Sinha, Indian-French novelist 
 Tom Stoppard, Czech-British playwright
 Albert Szent-Györgyi, Hungarian biochemist and essayist in English
 Yoko Tawada, Japanese-German writer
 Stefan Themerson Polish-French-English novelist, poet, film-maker
 R.S. Thomas, English poet, Welsh memoirist and autobiographer
 Matthew Tree, English-Catalan writer and novelist
 Héctor Tobar, Guatemalan-American journalist and novelist
 Ayelet Tsabari, Israeli-Canadian writer
 Anselm Turmeda, Majorcan, Catalan-Arabic writer
 Tristan Tzara, Romanian-French poet and DADAist
 Voltaire, French philosopher who also wrote and published in English
 David Zoppetti, Swiss-Japanese novelist and journalist

References

 

Exophonic